Gerald J. Bauerly "Jerry" (born 1943) was an American businessman, farmer, and politician.

Bauerly received his bachelor's and master's degree in government, political science, and education administration from St. Cloud State University. He lived in Sauk Rapids, Minnesota with his wife and family. Bauerly was a businessman and owner of Bauerly Brothers Construction. He was also a farmer and taught social studied at Sandstone-Finlayson High School. Bauerly served on the Foley School Board and was a Democrat. He also served in the Minnesota House of Representatives from 1987 to 1994.

References

1943 births
Living people
People from Sauk Rapids, Minnesota
St. Cloud State University alumni
Businesspeople from Minnesota
Farmers from Minnesota
Schoolteachers from Minnesota
School board members in Minnesota
Democratic Party members of the Minnesota House of Representatives